The 1999 Kroger St. Jude International was a men's tennis tournament played on indoor Hard courts in Memphis, United States, that was part of the Championship Series of the 1999 ATP Tour. It was the twenty-ninth edition of the tournament and was held 15 February – 21 February.

Seeds
Champion seeds are indicated in bold text while text in italics indicates the round in which those seeds were eliminated.

Draw

Finals

Top half

Section 1

Section 2

Bottom half

Section 3

Section 4

References

1999 ATP Tour
1998 Kroger St. Jude International - Singles